The Armenia national football team (Hayastani futboli azgayin havak'akan) represents Armenia in association football and is controlled by the Football Federation of Armenia, the governing body for football in Armenia.

After gaining independence from the Soviet Union, the team played its first international match on 12 October 1992. The national team has participated in the qualification of every major tournament from the UEFA Euro 1996 onwards, though they are yet to qualify for the final stages of either a UEFA European Football Championship or a FIFA World Cup. The team's main achievements were coming in third place in the UEFA Euro 2012 qualifying stage, and being promoted to the 2022–23 UEFA Nations League B.

The primary training ground is at the Technical Center-Academy of the Football Federation of Armenia in the northern Avan District of the capital Yerevan, and the team plays their home matches at the Republican Stadium.

History

Armenia became an independent state in 1991, the Armenian Soviet Socialist Republic having previously played for the Soviet Union national football team. The Football Federation of Armenia was founded on 18 January 1992 and established relations with FIFA in 1992 and with UEFA in 1993. The history of the Armenia national team began on 14 October 1992, when Armenia played its first match against Moldova. That meeting ended in a goalless draw. Since 1996, the team is a member of qualifiers European and World Championships. Armenia has competed in every UEFA European Championship qualifying and FIFA World Cup qualification since 1994.

The first head coach of the Armenian national squad was Soviet Armenian football star Eduard Markarov. Armenian winner of the UEFA Jubilee Awards and fellow Soviet Armenian football great Khoren Oganesian also became a head coach. Many of the early coaches of the national team never stayed for longer than two years. Scottish coach Ian Porterfield became head coach in 2006 and began to lead the team to some of its first successes in the international stage. Under his leadership, the Armenian team had played a series of great matches with victories over Kazakhstan 2–1, Poland 1–0 and Portugal 1–1, with Cristiano Ronaldo in the lineup. But then tragedy struck; the 62-year-old Porterfield died of cancer, leaving his started work unfinished. An acting assistant coach, Vardan Minasyan, became acting head coach following Porterfield's death. Minasyan learned much from Porterfield and Samvel Darbinyan, another former head coach of Armenia, during this time about coaching and managing. On 10 February 2009, after the draw for the qualifying round teams of the UEFA Euro 2012, by order of the President of the Football Federation of Armenia Ruben Hayrapetyan, Minasyan continued to lead the Armenian national squad, only now as the official head coach.

In the UEFA Euro 2012 qualifying matches, Minasyan led Armenia in Group B against Russia, Slovakia, Ireland, Macedonia and Andorra. Armenia, considered a heavy underdog, defeated the group favorite Slovakia with two crushing defeats 4–0 and 3–1, defeated Andorra in two matches as well 4–0 and 3–0, drew with Macedonia 2–2 and defeated them in the deciding match 4–1 and tied with the group winners Russia 0–0. The Armenian team scored the most goals out of Group B, with a total of 22. Henrikh Mkhitaryan of Armenia scored 6 goals, the most goals scored by a single player in Group B. The national team almost made the final draw, but controversially lost in a decisive match against Ireland 1–2. Armenian goalkeeper Roman Berezovsky was given a red card by Spanish referee Eduardo Gonzalez at the 26th-minute for supposedly touching the ball outside the goal area. However, replays clearly showed the ball touched his chest and never touched his hands. Replays also showed that Ireland striker Simon Cox had actually touched the ball with his right hand. Despite this, Gonzalez did not penalize Cox. Cox would later admit he touched the ball with his hand. Had Cox's offence been punished, Armenia would have been awarded a free-kick. Edgar Malakyan was swapped for replacement goalkeeper Arsen Petrosyan. Valeri Aleksanyan later accidentally scored an own goal past Petrosyan, which ended up deciding the match. Armenia and Ireland would each score another goal. The Football Federation of Armenia unsuccessfully filed protest over the match. Gonzalez had later resigned after the match. Despite not getting to play in the UEFA Euro 2012, Minasyan brought the Armenia national team to a record #41 FIFA ranking, placed the team in a personal best third place in the group stage and went on to become the longest leading head coach of the Armenia football team. Minasyan stated he was proud of the entire team. They were all welcomed in the airport back in Armenia as heroes.

After the incredible UEFA Euro 2012 run, the 2014 World Cup and Euro 2016 qualifiers were not successful, with the Armenian side stood near bottom in the 2014 World Cup run and even finished last without a single win in Euro 2016 campaign. Armenia salvaged some few pride in 2018 World Cup qualification when the Armenians managed to create a shocking 3–2 home win over Montenegro, which contributed to Montenegro's failure to qualify for the 2018 FIFA World Cup. After these disappointments, Vardan Minasyan returned to lead Armenia in the 2018–19 UEFA Nations League D, but finished behind Macedonia, including a humiliating 0–1 home loss to Gibraltar. Due to this humiliation, Minasyan was sacked and Armen Gyulbudaghyants was appointed new coach of Armenian side. The Armenians participated in the UEFA Euro 2020 qualifying along with giants Italy, Bosnia and Herzegovina, former European champions Greece, Finland and Liechtenstein. Armenia lost two opening fixtures to Bosnia 1–2 away and Finland 0–2 at home, and was supposed to get eliminated pretty early. However, Armenia began their resurgence following these losses, with a convincing 3–0 home cruise to Liechtenstein before managed to create a shocking 3–2 away win over Greece, former UEFA Euro 2004 champions. Armenia suffered a minor setback after losing at home to powerhouse Italy 1–3, before created another shock in their qualification with a 4–2 convincing win over Bosnia and Herzegovina in the same ground. Armenia was pulled back to the ground when they faced Greece, Finland and Italy in their games, with Armenia defeated in both games and eventually finished fifth in their group, failed to qualify for UEFA Euro 2020.

Armenia participated in the 2020–21 UEFA Nations League C and was seen as a minnow in a group containing strong North Macedonia and Georgia, along with fellow minnow Estonia. Armenia began with a 1–2 loss to North Macedonia away, before bounded back with an encouraging 2–0 home win to Estonia in September 2020. In October, Armenia had to play their designated "home game" away from their country in Poland due to 2020 Nagorno-Karabakh War, and disappointed with only a 2–2 draw to Georgia and 1–1 draw to Estonia, thus leaving impression that Armenia would flounder from the chance to get promotion. Yet, in November the same year, despite having to play away from home, and without their talisman and captain Henrikh Mkhitaryan, Armenia managed what would be the country's greatest comeback in the history, beating Georgia right in Tbilisi 2–1 before stunned the Fyromians, who had qualified for Euro 2020, 1–0, in their designated home game in Cyprus. These wins had not just ensured Armenia's promotion to 2022–23 UEFA Nations League B, but it also meant Armenia could be the first Caucasus country to get a FIFA World Cup playoff ticket. Moreover, the League B season in 2022–23 could also ensure Armenia a playoff place for the UEFA Euro 2024.

Armenia participated in the 2022 World Cup qualification and was seen weak to the group containing strong Germany, Iceland, Romania and North Macedonia. Armenia started with a difficult 1–0 win to Liechtenstein away, leaving yet again an impression that Armenia would just end up being mopped by the remainders. However, Armenia stunned both Iceland and Romania on their home fixtures 2–0 and 3–2 to top the group for the first time ever, raising the country's hopes of qualifying for an improbable maiden World Cup. Ultimately however, Armenia's campaign ended in bitter disappointment as they failed to win a single one of their remaining seven qualifying games, finding themselves on the end of a 6-0 trashing by Germany and even being held to a 1–1 draw at home by lowly Liechtenstein. Armenia finished a distant fourth place in the group, ahead of Liechtenstein and an underwhelming Iceland side but six points behind playoff-bound North Macedonia and even five points behind third-placed Romania.

Stadium

Hrazdan Stadium was built from 1969 to 1970 on Athens St., Kentron in a period of 18 months with the financial support of the oil magnate Calouste Gulbenkian Foundation. A total amount of 5 million rubles was allocated for Hrazdan. The stadium was named after the slope of the Hrazdan River. It is the largest stadium in Armenia, with more than 70,000 seats. The opening of the stadium took place on 29 November 1970. The Armenia national team played home matches in Hrazdan until 2000. Several Armenian football clubs also played in Hrazdan. In Soviet times, it was one of the largest stadiums in the Soviet Union (among the top four) and one of the few double-tiered stadiums. Hrazdan was the football ground stadium for Ararat Yerevan. Hrazdan Stadium hosted its first official football match on 19 May 1971 when Ararat Yerevan defeated Kairat 3–0 in front of a record 78,000 spectators. The stadium would host Ararat Yerevan for the final victory of the club in the 1973 Soviet Top League and in the 1973 and 1975 Soviet Cup. The Soviet Union national football team played only two matches at the stadium, both of which date back to 1978. In April of that year, in a friendly game against Finland, the USSR won 10–2. Six months later, in a qualifying match for the UEFA Euro 1980 against Greece the Soviet team won again 2–0. The match with Finland hosted 12,000 spectators and the match with Greece hosted 40,000. The capacity of the stadium decreased from 70,000 to an all-seater of 53,849 spectators. By the second half of 2012, Hrazdan was completely renovated to become the regular venue of the national team's home matches.

The Republican Stadium was renovated in 1999 and, since 2000, has been the home ground for Armenia. The stadium was built in 1953 and finished within a year's time. Republican Stadium has a capacity of 14,968. During the Soviet period and onward from 1953 to 1999, it was known as Dinamo Stadium. The stadium had its official name changed to "Republican Stadium named after Vazgen Sargsyan" in 1999, after Armenian war hero and former Prime Minister of Armenia Vazgen Sargsyan, who died that year. Local clubs Pyunik and Ulisses play home matches at the Republican Stadium. In 2008, the stadium went under a large-scale development in order to modernize the playing surface and to create a high level VIP section and other facilities which met UEFA standards.

Armenia played a match in Hrazdan in 2008 against Turkey after partial renovation earlier that year. The number of seats decreased from 75,000 to 53,849. It is planned to hold Armenia's home matches after a complete renovation in 2012. On 12 October 2012, Armenia played a 2014 FIFA World Cup qualification match against Italy, but has not used Hrazdan since. Hrazdan is used mostly for Armenian football clubs and a number of other athletic competitions.

Team image

Jerseys and colour
The home gear color were previously the Red-Blue-Orange Armenian tricolour, designed by Stepan Malkhasyants. All three colors were on the first Armenia national team jerseys issued. The definition of the colors, as stated in government website, is:

The Red emblematizes the Armenian Highland, the Armenian people's continued struggle for survival, maintenance of the Orthodox Christian faith, Armenia's independence and freedom. The Blue emblematizes the will of the people of Armenia to live beneath peaceful skies. The Orange emblematizes the creative talent and hard-working nature of the people of Armenia.

In the Euro 2012 qualification matches, played in 2010 and 2011, Armenia's home colors were red-blue-red, produced by Hummel. Beginning with the May 2012 friendly with Greece, Armenia switched to all-red home colours and an all-white away kit produced by Adidas.

Kit suppliers

Recent results and forthcoming fixtures

2022

2023

Managers

Players

Current squad
The following players are called up for a UEFA Euro 2024 qualifying match against Turkey and a friendly match against Cyprus on March 25 and 28, 2023.

Caps and goals correct as of 19 November 2022, after the match against Albania.

Recent call-ups
The following players were called up in the last 12 months.

Notes
INJ = It is not part of the current squad due to injury.
PRE = Preliminary squad/standby.
RET = Retired from the national team.

Records

Players in bold are still active with Armenia.

Most appearances

Top goalscorers

Competitive record

FIFA World Cup

UEFA European Championship record

UEFA Nations League

All-time head-to-head record

See also

 Armenia national football team results
 Armenia national under-21 football team
 Armenia national under-19 football team
 Armenia national under-17 football team
 List of Armenian international footballers

References

External links

 
 FIFA profile (archived)
 UEFA profile
 RSSSF archive of results 1992–
 RSSSF archive of most capped players and highest goalscorers
 Profile at National Football Teams
 Armfootball.tripod.com
 All official and unofficial games

 
European national association football teams
1992 establishments in Armenia
National sports teams established in 1992